Günther's reed snake (Liopeltis frenata) is a species of snake.
Distribution:
India (Assam, Arunachal Pradesh (Namdapha - Changlang district) ), 
Myanmar (= Burma), Laos, Vietnam,
China (Tibet, Yunnan)

References

 Boulenger, George A. 1890 The Fauna of British India, Including Ceylon and Burma. Reptilia and Batrachia. Taylor & Francis, London, xviii, 541 pp.
 Günther, A. 1858 Catalogue of Colubrine snakes of the British Museum. London, I - XVI, 1 - 281
The Reptile Database: Liopeltis frenata

Colubrids
Liopeltis
Reptiles described in 1858
Reptiles of India
Reptiles of Myanmar
Reptiles of Laos
Reptiles of Vietnam

Snakes of Vietnam
Snakes of Asia
Taxobox binomials not recognized by IUCN